Maaka (also known as Maha, Maka, Maga, Magha) is an Afro-Asiatic language spoken in the Yobe State in North-Eastern Nigeria. As of 1993, it was spoken by approximately 10,000 people.

References

External links
 Maka language resources from UCLA
 Maka Wordlist 

West Chadic languages
Languages of Nigeria